Sanita is a Latvian feminine given name, translating to "Healthy Little Girl" in native Latvian. Its name day is September 14.

Notable people named Sanita 
Sanita Levave (born 1988), New Zealand rugby union player
Sanita Laizane (born 1988), Latvian bear tracking national champion
Sanita Pušpure (born 1981), Latvian-Irish professional rower

References 

Latvian feminine given names
Feminine given names